Kareem Foster (born 6 September 2000) is a Caymanian footballer who currently plays for Westfield. Besides Cayman Islands, he has played in England.

Career statistics

International

References

2000 births
Living people
Association football forwards
Caymanian footballers
Cayman Islands youth international footballers
Cayman Islands international footballers
Caymanian expatriate footballers
Caymanian expatriate sportspeople in England
Expatriate footballers in England
Cayman Islands under-20 international footballers
People from Grand Cayman